Jiyang is a county-level district under the jurisdiction of Sanya city, in Hainan province, China. The district was established on 12 February 2014.

Former administrative subdivisions
Jiyang has jurisdiction over the former towns and subdistricts of:

References

External links
 

Sanya
County-level divisions of Hainan